Fort McIntosh is an American military fortification from the American Revolution located near the Satilla River in Brantley County, Georgia, near the present site of the intersection of U.S. Route 82 and Georgia State Route 110 near the town of Atkinson, Georgia.

The log fortress was constructed by William McIntosh, brother of Colonel Lachlan McIntosh, to guard the Georgia frontier against attacks by Tory sympathizing Floridians and hostile Native American tribes.

The fort was a square log and earth structure about 100 feet on each side with a bastion
at each corner. The fort was garrisoned by 40 men from the 3rd South Carolina Regiment and
20 Continentals from the 1st Brigade Georgia Militia, under command of Captain Richard Winn.

On February 17, 1777, the base was attacked by Tories and Indians and forced to surrender the next day.  All of the prisoners were released with the exception of two officers who were taken as hostages to St. Augustine, Florida.

References

External links
 Fort McIntosh historical marker

McIntosh
Buildings and structures in Brantley County, Georgia